Dobraya Volya is a rural locality (a settlement) in Gonokhovsky Selsoviet, Zavyalovsky District, Altai Krai, Russia. The population was 91 as of 2013. There are 2 streets.

Geography 
Dobraya Volya is located 33 km northeast of Zavyalovo (the district's administrative centre) by road. Gonokhovo is the nearest rural locality.

References 

Rural localities in Zavyalovsky District, Altai Krai